Bruce Burgess is a documentary filmmaker. Burgess has written, directed and hosted a series of documentary specials that relate to conspiracy theory and fringe theory subject matters like Bigfoot, the Bermuda Triangle, the mummified corpse of Mary Magdalene in France, ancient history, alien abductions, as well as on the British Royal family, paranormal claims, CIA assassinations and global terrorism.

Career 

Born in London in 1968, Burgess studied at Hill House School in London, then Harrow School. He started a charity in 1986, EDUCAID, raising money through schools for Bob Geldof's Band Aid Trust.

From 1988 to 1990 he worked for BreakMarketing, an innovative youth marketing company operating out of the offices of Harvey Goldsmith Entertainments, working on promotion, marketing and sponsorship.  While at Breakmarketing he helped to produce Peter Boizot's Soho Jazz Festival, and worked on the launch events and promotion of the London Daily News for Robert Maxwell.

From 1990 to 1993 he was asked to be managing director of Unique Public Relations in London, representing major clients from both the UK and US.

From 1993 to 1999, he was Chairman of Transmedia Productions, an independent production company.

In 1996 Burgess created the London Restaurant Awards, which later became the ITV London Restaurant Awards. In 1998 Burgess founded the first London Restaurant Week with American Express and The London Tourist Board.

In 1998 Burgess was asked to become a media adviser to the Conservative Party by William Hague.

In 2002 Burgess formed a Los Angeles-based production company, Bluebook Films, with René Barnett, and in 2004 wrote and directed his first 35 mm short film Rosbeef which premiered "out of competition" at the Cannes Film Festival. Burgess and Barnett also worked together on the 2008 film Bloodline.

In 2013 with the collaboration of the journalist Marcello Polastri, he will publish a story about forbidden history in Sardinia, dedicating himself to the giants of the Monte Prama.

Awards 

Burgess' film on Area 51, Dreamland was voted best documentary by UFO Magazine in 1998, and top of the 'viewers choice poll' of TLC Channel in 2003.

Criticism

Burgess directed the documentary Dreamland (a Transmedia and Dandelion Production for Sky Television, 1996) an alleged exposé of the secret Pentagon facility known as Area 51, that was described as an example of uncritical reporting: "...infuriating nonsense to mark the 50th anniversary of the crash at Roswell, New Mexico. The usual suspects are rounded up to tow their party lines (Stanton Friedman, Bob Lazar, et al.) and producer/director/would be intrepid presenter Bruce Burgess does absolutely nothing to question what he's being told or even point out the idiocy of some of the arguments."

Filmography 
Rosbeef (2004), writer/director
Bloodline (2008), writer/director

Television 
The Restaurant Show (1993), director
Raw 94 (1994), director
The Cattle Files (1997), director
The Uninvited (1997), director
Impact Earth (1996), director
William: The Making of a King (1996), director
Dreamland (1996), director
The Royal Soap Opera (1997), director
The Lost Ark (1997), director
Bulletcatchers (1998), director
Crossing the Line-Sabina’s Story (1998), director
Rocket Men (1999), director
Raising the Titanic (1999), director
Broken Dagger (2000), director
William: A King in Waiting (2000), director
The Real Jack the Ripper (2000), director
The Bermuda Triangle Solved (2001), director
Bombs & Basques – In the Firing Line (2001), director
Network of Terror (2001), director
Bigfootville (2002), director
In Search of the Holy Grail (2003), director
Desert Blast (2003), director
The Ark of the Covenant Revealed (2004), director
The Secret Life of Uri Geller (documentary, 2013), producer
The Lost Treasure of The Templars (Forbidden History, 1:1, 2013) writer/director (shown on Yesterday channel)
The Third Secret of Fatima (Forbidden History, 1:2, 2013) writer/director
The Bloodline of Christ (Forbidden History, 1:3, 2013) writer/director
The Mystery of the Giants (Forbidden History, 1:4, 2013) writer/director with the collaboration of the reporter Marcello Polastri.
The Treasure of Solomon (Forbidden History, 1:5, 2013) writer/director
The Secrets of the Alchemists (Forbidden History, 1:6, 2013) writer/director
History's Ultimate Spies (2014), director
The Genius of Nikola Tesla (Forbidden History, 2:6, 2015) writer/director
Top Secret Nazi UFOS (Forbidden History, 2:5, 2015) writer/director
The Oracles (Forbidden History, 2:4, 2015) writer/director
The Illuminati (Forbidden History, 2:3, 2015) writer/director
The Holy Grail (Forbidden History, 2:2, 2015) writer/director
The Lost Treasures of Petra (Forbidden History, 2:1, 2015) writer/director
In Search of the real King Arthur (Forbidden History, 3:6, 2016) writer/director
Inside The Cult of Satan (Forbidden History, 3:5, 2016) writer/director
Bloodlust: Real Vampires (Forbidden History, 3:4, 2016) writer/director
The Man In The Iron Mask (Forbidden History, 3:3, 2016) writer/director
Hitler: Suicide or Survivor? (Forbidden History, 3:2, 2016) writer/director
The Real Ark of the Covenant (Forbidden History, 3:1, 2016) writer/director
Can we Time Travel? (documentary, in development)
The Scole Experiment (two-part documentary, in development)
What Happens when we die? (television series, in development)
The Jesus Conspiracy (television series, in development)
The Shadow Men (television series, in development)
The Secret Nazis (television series, in development)
Dark Water (television series, in development)
Holy Relics (in development)
The Forbidden Archaeologist (documentary film, in development)
Return to Abydos (film, in development)
The Main Course (scripted feature film, in development)
Meet the Cha Cha's (television series, in development)

References

External links 
 bloodlinethemovie.com
 bruce-burgess.com
 

1968 births
Living people
Film people from London
English documentary filmmakers
People educated at Harrow School